.htpasswd is a flat-file used to store usernames and password  for basic authentication on an Apache HTTP Server. The name of the file is given in the .htaccess configuration, and can be anything although ".htpasswd" is the canonical name. The file name starts with a dot, because most Unix-like operating systems consider any file that begins with dot to be hidden.  This file is often maintained with the shell command "htpasswd" which can add, delete, and update users, and will properly encode the password for use (so that it is easily checked, but not reversed back to the original password).

The file consists of rows, each row corresponding to a username, followed by a colon, followed by a string containing the hashed password optionally prepended by an algorithm specifier ("$2y$", "$apr1$" or "{SHA}") and/or salt. The hash historically used "UNIX crypt" style with MD5 or SHA1 as common alternatives, although as of version 2.2.18 a variant of MD5 is now the default.
 Athelstan:RLjXiyxx56D9s
 Mama:RLMzFazUFPVRE
 Papa:RL8wKTlBoVLKk

Resources available from the Apache HTTP Server can be restricted to just the users listed in the files created by htpasswd. The .htpasswd file can be used to protect the entire directory it is placed in, as well as particular files.

See also
Apache HTTP Server
Configuration file
HTTP+HTML form-based authentication

References

External links
Apache: htpasswd - Manage user files for basic authentication
htpasswd script in python (no need to install apache utils) - source code in Python
JavaScript-based online Htpassword generator

Configuration files
Web technology